Jarir may refer to:

Jarir (poet), Arab poet
Jarir Bookstore, a Saudi company specializing in office retailing and book publishing.
an alternative name for the Somali Bantu